Live Innocence! is the second video album by the British heavy metal band Saxon, released in VHS and Laserdisc at the beginning of 1986. The tape contains footage of a concert held in Madrid, Spain in June 1985 during the Live Innocence Tour and two video clips used for the promotion of the studio album Innocence Is No Excuse.<

Track listing
 "Back on the Streets" (video clip)
 "Dallas 1 PM"
 "Devil Rides Out"
 "Everybody Up"
 "A Little Bit of What You Fancy"
 "Broken Heroes"
 "Play It Loud"
 "Shout It Out"
 "Crusader"
 "Medley" (Heavy Metal Thunder/Stand Up and Be Counted/Taking Your Chances/Warrior)
 "Rockin' Again" (video clip)

Personnel

Band members
Biff Byford - vocals
Graham Oliver - guitar
Paul Quinn - guitar
Steve Dawson - bass
Nigel Glockler - drums

 Production
Noel Oliver - director
James Elwart - producer
Simon Hanhart - sound producer
Chris Gabrin - director of video clips
Henrietta Roper - producer of video clips

References

Saxon (band) video albums
Live video albums
1985 video albums
EMI Records video albums